"Sposa son disprezzata" ("I am wife and I am scorned") is an Italian aria written by Geminiano Giacomelli. It is used in Vivaldi's pasticcio, Bajazet.

The music for this aria was not composed by Vivaldi. The aria, originally called Sposa, non mi conosci, was taken from the Geminiano Giacomelli's opera La Merope (1734), composed before Vivaldi's pasticcio Bajazet. It was a common practice during Vivaldi's time to compile arias from other composers with one own's work for an opera. Vivaldi himself composed the arias for the good characters and mostly used existing arias from other composers for the villains in this opera. "Sposa son disprezzata" is sung by a villain character, Irene.  Vivaldi has recently been attributed as the composer of the work, perhaps because Cecilia Bartoli's album "If You Love Me—'Se tu m'ami': Eighteenth-Century Italian Songs," which uses Alessandro Parisotti's 19th-century piano version, attributes the work solely to Vivaldi.

Libretto 

In the 1880s adaptation by Alessandro Parisotti, the second stanza is left out. This adaption is the most widely heard, popularized by mezzo-soprano Cecilia Bartoli in the aforementioned album If You Love Me (Se tu m'ami).

References
 Groves Music Online  (subscription required)
  Sposa son disprezzata libretto
 Who composed "Sposa son disprezzata"?
  Sposa son disprezzata musical sheet available for purchase

Opera excerpts
Antonio Vivaldi